Baralle is a commune in the Pas-de-Calais department in the Hauts-de-France region in northern France.

Geography
A farming village located 15 miles (24 km) southeast of Arras at the junction of the D14, D16 and D19 roads.  The entire commune was obliterated during World War I.

Population

Sights
 The ruins of an early castle.
 The church of St. Georges, dating from the twentieth century.

See also
Communes of the Pas-de-Calais department

References

Communes of Pas-de-Calais